Heyshott is a village and civil parish in the Chichester district of West Sussex, England. It is approximately three miles south of Midhurst.  Like many villages it has lost its shop but still has one pub, the Unicorn Inn. The hamlet of Hoyle is to the northeast of the village.

In the 2001 census the parish covered 938 hectares (2316 acres) and had 131 households with a total population of 309 of whom 137 residents were economically active. The 2011 Census population was 270.

The Anglican parish church is dedicated to St James the Great. Bishop Morris Maddocks is buried at the local church, alongside his wife Anne.

It is well known locally for its Bonfire and Firework display, which is held on a Saturday evening close to 5 November, from 7pm.

It also gives its name to the nearby site, "Heyshott Down Nature Reserve" - which is found just to the south of the village. The reserve is an SSSI (site of special scientific interest) containing neolithic and Bronze Age earthworks on a chalk grassland. The reserve offers a view over the village and a large portion of the south-western Weald.

Notable residents
 Richard Cobden (1804-1865), English manufacturer, politician and trade activist
General Frank Messervy (1893-1973), general in the British Army in WW2
 H. J. R. Murray (1868-1955), English educationalist and chess historian
 Philip Noel-Baker (1889-1982), diplomat, academic, campaigner and Olympian
 Trevor Eve (born 1951), English actor

References

External links

 St James's Church
 Heyshott Down nature Reserve
 Historical information on GENUKI

Villages in West Sussex
Chichester District